is a former Japanese football forward.

Career
In 2010 he started his professional career playing in the Romanian Second Division for Gaz Metan CFR Craiova.
In August 2011, he joined Slovak club Bodva Moldava nad Bodvou.

In July 2013, Nakamura joined J. League Division 2 team FC Gifu on a free transfer.

On February 4, 2017, he announced the end of his professional career.

Career statistics

References

External links
 
 
 
  FC Gifu Official website - profile

1987 births
Living people
Kokushikan University alumni
Association football people from Shizuoka Prefecture
Japanese footballers
Czech First League players
J1 League players
J2 League players
CS Turnu Severin players
Liga II players
2. Liga (Slovakia) players
FK Bodva Moldava nad Bodvou players
FK Viktoria Žižkov players
MŠK Rimavská Sobota players
FC Gifu players
Júbilo Iwata players
Japanese expatriate footballers
Expatriate footballers in Romania
Japanese expatriate sportspeople in Romania
Expatriate footballers in the Czech Republic
Japanese expatriate sportspeople in the Czech Republic
Expatriate footballers in Slovakia
Japanese expatriate sportspeople in Slovakia
Association football forwards